Žilina (or ;  , names in other languages) is a city in north-western Slovakia, around  from the capital Bratislava, close to both the Czech and Polish borders. It is the fourth largest city of Slovakia with a population of approximately 80,000, an important industrial center, the largest city on the Váh river, and the seat of a kraj (Žilina Region) and of an okres (Žilina District). It belongs to the Upper Váh region of tourism.

Etymology
The name is derived from Slavic/Slovak word žila - a "(river) vein". Žilina means "a place with many watercourses". Alternatively, it is a secondary name derived from Žilinka river or from the name of the local people, Žilín/Žiliňane.

History

The area around today's Žilina was inhabited in the late Stone Age (about 20,000 BC). In the 5th century, Slavs started to move into the area. However, the first written reference to Žilina was in 1208 as terra de Selinan. From the second half of the 10th century until 1918, it was part of the Kingdom of Hungary.

In the middle of the 13th century, terra Sylna was the property of the Cseszneky de Milvány family. The city started to develop around 1300, and, according to records in 1312, it was already a town. In 1321, King Charles I made Žilina a free royal town. On 7 May 1381, King Louis I issued Privilegium pro Slavis, which made the Slav inhabitants equal to the Germans by allocating half of the seats at the city council to Slavs. The town was burned in 1431 by the Hussites.

During the 17th century, Žilina gained position as a center of manufacturing, trade, and education, and, during the Baroque age, many monasteries and churches, as well as the Budatín Castle, were built. In the Revolutions of 1848, Slovak volunteers, part of the Imperial Army, won a battle near the city against Hungarian honveds and gardists.

The city boomed in the second half of the 19th century as new railway tracks were built: the Kassa Oderberg Railway was finished in 1872 and the railway to Bratislava (Pozsony in Hungarian) in 1883, and new factories started to spring up, such as the drapery factory Slovena (1891) and the Považie chemical works (1892).

It was one of the first municipalities to sign the Martin Declaration (30 October 1918), and until March 1919, it was the seat of the Slovak government. On 6 October 1938, shortly after the Munich Agreement, the autonomy of Slovakia within Czechoslovakia was declared in Žilina.

During the Holocaust in Slovakia, tens of thousands of Jews were deported from Žilina. Žilina was captured on 30 April 1945 by Czechoslovak and Soviet troops of the 4th Ukrainian Front, after which it again became part of Czechoslovakia. 
After the war, the city continued its development with many new factories, schools and housing projects being built. It was the seat of the Žilina Region from 1949 to 1960 and again since 1996.

Today, Žilina is the fourth largest city in Slovakia, the third most important industrial center and the seat of a university, the Žilinská univerzita (founded in 1953). Since 1990 the historical center of the city has been largely restored and the city has built trolleybus lines.

Geography
It is located in the Upper Váh region at the confluence of three rivers: Váh, flowing from the east into the south-west, Kysuca, flowing from the north and Rajčanka rivers from the south, in the Žilina Basin. The city is surrounded by these mountain ranges: Malá Fatra, Súľovské vrchy, Javorníky and Kysucká vrchovina. Protected areas nearby include the Strážov Mountains Protected Landscape Area, the Kysuce Protected Landscape Area, and the Malá Fatra National Park. There are two hydroelectric dams on the Váh river around Žilina: the Žilina dam in the east and the Hričov dam in the west.

Climate
Žilina lies in the north temperate zone and has a continental climate with four distinct seasons. It is characterized by a significant variation between hot summers and cold, snowy winters. Snow cover lasts from 60 to 80 days per year.

Symbol
The coat of arms of Žilina is a golden double-cross (so-called cross of Lorraine) with roots and two golden stars on an olive-green background. The double-cross is of Byzantine origin and stems from Cyrillic-methodic tradition. This is one of the oldest municipal coat of arms, not only in Slovakia, but in Europe. It has been used as the city's symbol since 1378.

Demographics

Žilina has a population of 82,664 (as of September 2020), with the population of the urban area of 108,114 and the population of the metro area of 159,729. According to the 2001 census, 96.9% of inhabitants were Slovaks, 1.6% Czechs, 0.2% Romani, 0.1% Hungarians and 0.1% Moravians. The religious makeup was 74.9% Roman Catholics, 16.7% people with no religious affiliation, and 3.7% Lutherans.

Economy
Žilina is the main industrial hub of the upper Váh river basin region, with a fast-growing economy as north-west Slovakia's business center with large retail and construction sectors.

By far the biggest and most important employer is Korean car maker Kia Motors. By 2009, the plant produced 300,000 cars a year and had up to 3,000 employees. Kia Motors' direct investment in the Žilina car plant amounts to over 1.5 billion USD. In 2009 the Žilina car plant produced Kia Cee'd, Kia Sportage and Hyundai ix35 car models. Kia Motors is further upgrading its capacity to be ready to produce engines for a sister company, Hyundai, located at Nošovice in the Czech Republic with a planned investment of US$200 million.

Žilina is also the seat of the biggest Slovak construction and transportation engineering company, Vahostav. The chemical industry is represented by Považské chemické závody and Tento, a paper mill company. Siemens Mobility also has an engineering center in Žilina.

Main sights

The historical center of the city, reconstructed in the early 1990s is protected as a city monument reserve. It is centered on the Mariánske námestie and Andrej Hlinka squares. The Mariánske námestie square has 106 arcade passages and 44 burgher houses along the whole square. It is dominated by the Church of St. Paul the Apostle, the old building of the city council, and the baroque statue of the Virgin Mary. Nearby is the Church of the Holy Trinity, a sacral building built around 1400, which is since February 2008 the cathedral of the Diocese of Žilina.

It is one of the first Romanesque churches in Slovakia, dating back to the years 1200–1250, by the experts. The legend goes that the Hungarian King István I himself ordered to build it. Valuable is the inner decoration of the church. Wall paintings originate from approximately 1260; in 1950 they were discovered and later on restored by the Žilina fine artist Mojmír Vlkoláček. Nowadays it is a popular place for wedding ceremonies.

Other landmarks around the city include:
 Budatín Castle, housing Považie Museum with its tinker trade exhibition
 The wooden Roman Catholic church of St. George in the Trnové section (one of the few outside north-eastern Slovakia)
 The Orthodox synagogue, which now houses the Museum of Jewish culture
 The New Synagogue, now a cultural centre

The city is a starting point for various locations of western and eastern Slovakia, including hiking trails into the Lesser Fatra and Greater Fatra mountains. Other locations of interest include Bojnice Castle, Strečno, Orava region, and the villages of Čičmany and Vlkolínec.

Culture
Žilina is candidate city for the title of European Capital of Culture 2026.

Žilina host several cultural institutions:
 Mestské divadlo Žilina (Žilina City Theater)
 Rosenfeld Palace (Žilina city cultural centre Rosenfeld Palace)
 Považská galéria umenia v Žiline (Považie galerie of contemporary art)
 Považské múzeum (Považie museum), situated in the Budatín castle but also running Strečno castle, Palace in Bytča, 
open-air museum Čičmany, manor-house in Divinka
 Bábkové divadlo Žilina (Žilina Puppet Theatre)
 Múzeum židovskej kultúry (Museum of Jewish culture)
 Štátny komorný orchester Žilina (Slovak Sinfonietta Žilina)
 Krajská knižnica v Žiline (Regional Library in Žilina)
 Stanica Žilina-Záriečie (Cultural Center Stanica)
 Nová synagóga Žilina (New Synagogue Žilina)

Žilina is also home of two multi 3D digital theaters, in Mirage Shopping Centre - Ster Century Cinemas and Cinemax MAX in Max Shopping Centre OC Max Solinky.

The city host also several cultural events:
 Žilina Cultural Summer
 Fest Anca - Animated film festival
 Žilina Literary festival
 KIOSK – festival of new Slovak theater
 Allegretto Žilina – International music Festival
 Puppet Žilina
 Jánošik's Days

Sport

Football (soccer) club MŠK Žilina plays in the top Slovak division Fortuna liga and is one of the most successful teams in recent years, having won five domestic titles and been runners-up three times between 2001 and 2010. The team's colors are the yellow and green, taken from the city's flag. Home games are played at the Stadium Pod Dubňom which is situated at the edge of city center in the neighborhood of the ice hockey stadium. They played in the 2010-11 UEFA Champions League in the group stage for the first time in their history.

Ice hockey club MsHK Žilina plays in the Slovak Extraliga. They have won one domestic title so far.

Rugby club plays in Slovak league, and is the one with the best location in Slovakia. They participate in the Czech championship, with the support of Olomouc Rugby Club, and made a partnership with Rugby Klub Bratislava to organize rugby events.

Slovak professional road bicycle racer for World Tour team Bora-Hansgrohe, three-time world champion Peter Sagan, was born in Žilina in 1990, and is considered one of cycling's most promising young talents, having earned many prestigious victories in his early twenties. He was the winner of the points classification in the Tour de France in 2012 through 2016; as a result, Sagan became the first rider to win the classification in his first five attempts. In 2015, he was also the first Slovak cyclist to win the UCI Road World Championships.

Government

The city is governed by a mayor and a city council (Slovak: mestské zastupiteľstvo). The mayor is the head of the city and its chief executive, with a four-year term of office. The current mayor is Peter Fiabáne . The council is the city's legislative body, with 31 councillors. The last municipal election was held in 2014 and councillors are elected to four-year terms, concurrent with the mayor's. Žilina is divided into eight electoral districts, consisting of the following neighborhoods:
 Staré mesto, Hliny I-IV, Hliny VIII (5 councillors)
 Hliny V-VII, Bôrik (4 councillors)
 Solinky (5 councillors)
 Vlčince (6 councillors)
 Hájik (3 councillors)
 Bytčica, Rosinky, Trnové, Mojšová Lúčka (2 councillors)
 Závodie, Bánová, Strážov, Žilinská Lehota (2 councillors)
 Budatín, Považský Chlmec, Vranie, Brodno, Zádubnie, Zástranie (3 councillors)

Žilina is the capital of one of eight considerably autonomous Regions of Slovakia. It is also the capital of a smaller district. The Žilina District (Slovak: okres Žilina) is nested within the Žilina Region.

The city also hosts a regional branch of the National Bank of Slovakia.

Education

The city is home to the University of Žilina, which has seven faculties and 12,402 students, including 625 doctoral students.

There are 18 public primary schools, one private primary school, and three church primary schools. Overall, they enroll 7,484 pupils. The city's system of secondary education (some middle schools and all high schools) consists of eight gymnasia with 3,514 students, ten specialized high schools with 3,696 students, and nine vocational schools with 4,870 students.

Transport
The city is an important international road junction, and Žilina railway station is a major rail junction.

Roads and railways connect the city with Bratislava and Prievidza in the south, Čadca in the north, and Martin in the east. The construction of the D1, and D3 motorways and their feeders continues towards Žilina.

Public transport within the city is operated by DPMZ and consists of buses (since 1949) and trolleybuses (since 1994).

Night bus services started in Žilina in 1970 with the introduction of one route, the 50, which continues to operate as the sole night bus in the city, operating from 22:55 to 04:22. Route 50 makes a circuitous route of all major residential areas, and includes a stop at Železničná stanica, the principal railway station.

Notable people

 AYA (band)
 Zuzana Babiaková
 Pavol Bajza
 Peter Baláž
 Štefan Beniač (1869–1942), Slovak priest, preacher and publicist
 Tomáš Bezdeda (born 1985, here), singer
 Peter Cehlárik (born 1995), Slovak hockey player 
 Jakab Cseszneky de Csesznek et Visk, medieval magnate
 Martin Dúbravka, footballer
 Martin Ďurica, footballer
 Ľubomír Feldek (born 1936, here), Slovak poet
 Ján Franek (born 1960, here)
 Ľudovít Fulla
 Stanislav Griga (born 1961, here), football coach
 Ladislav Hecht (1909–2004), tennis player
 Peter Hoferica, footballer
 Anton Hrnko (born 1955, here), historian and politician
 Tomáš Hubočan, footballer
 Miroslav Hýll, footballer
 Juraj Jánošík, Slovak national hero
 Michael Kolář, cyclist 
 Karol Križan, ice hockey player
 Dušan Kuciak
 Martin Kuciak
 Branislav Labant
 Gwido Langer
 Dávid Leimdörfer, rabbi and author
 Vladimír Leitner
 Ján Mikolaj
 Marek Mintál, football (soccer) player
 Juraj Okoličány (1943–2008), ice hockey referee
 Roman Ondak
 Emil Pažický
 Peter Pekarík, football player
 Ronald Petrovický, ice hockey player
 Lukáš Pohůnek, conductor
 Dárius Rusnák
 Branislav Rzeszoto
 Juraj Sagan, cyclist
 Peter Sagan, cyclist
 Ján Slota
 Ľuboš Šoška
 Peter Šoška
 Martin Šulík, actor
 Miroslav Šustek, writer
 Viktor Tausk, psychoanalyst
 Jozef Vengloš
 Radoslav Židek, snowboarder, first Slovak medal winner at the Winter Olympic Games

Twin towns – sister cities

Žilina is twinned with:

 Bielsko-Biała, Poland
 Changchun, China
 Dnipro, Ukraine
 Essen, Belgium
 Frýdek-Místek, Czech Republic
 Grodno, Belarus
 Kikinda, Serbia
 Krasnoyarsk, Russia
 Nanterre, France
 Plzeň, Czech Republic
 Prague 15, Czech Republic
 Třinec, Czech Republic

References

External links

 
 DPMZ - public transport official site
 Žilina official tourist guide
 Žilinak.sk - Leading news website
 Map and information system of Žilina
 Mesto v ktorom žijeme a nieje nám ľahostajné

 
Cities and towns in Slovakia
Žilina Region